Chrośnica may refer to the following places in Poland:
Chrośnica, Lower Silesian Voivodeship (south-west Poland)
Chrośnica, Greater Poland Voivodeship (west-central Poland)